Stinson is an English and Scottish surname. There are many variants, including Stephenson, Stevenson, and Steenson. The Stinson family first landed in Glasgow around the year 1100, from Denmark, changing their name of "Stenson" to Anglicize it.

Notable people with the surname include:
Albert Stinson (born 1944), Short-lived Jazz Bass Prodigy
Andrea Stinson (born 1967), basketball player
Bess Stinson (1902-1996), Arizona state legislator
Bob Stinson (1959–1995), founding member and lead guitarist for the American rock band The Replacements
Darrel Stinson (born 1945), retired politician in British Columbia, Canada
Doug Stinson Canadian mathematician and cryptographer
Ford E. Stinson, Louisiana state legislator
G. E. Stinson, American guitarist and founding member of new age / electronic musical group Shadowfax
Harry Stinson, real estate developer in Toronto, Canada
Harry Edward Stinson (1898–1975), sculptor
J. T. Stinson, 20th century fruit specialist and the first director of the Missouri State Fruit Experiment Station
Jonathan Stinson (born 1978), American opera singer and composer
Katherine Stinson (1891–1977), fourth woman in the United States to obtain a pilot's certificate
Kathy Stinson, Canadian children's writer
Lloyd Stinson (1904–1976), politician in Manitoba, Canada
Thomas Stinson (1798–1864), Ontario merchant, banker & land owner
Tommy Stinson (born 1966), American bassist who was a member of Guns N' Roses until 2015
Tyler Stinson (born 1986), American mixed martial artist

Fictional characters:
Barney Stinson, a fictional character in the American TV series How I Met Your Mother

References